Hampig Sassounian (born January 1, 1963) or Harry M. Sassounian, is an American citizen involved in the 1982 assassination of Turkish Consul General Kemal Arıkan in Los Angeles. He was identified as one of  two gunmen by witnesses. In court, Sassounian said that he was motivated by the Turkish government's open denial of the Armenian genocide. The jury determined that Arıkan was targeted due to his nationality. Sassounian was sentenced to life, but was granted parole 2021. He subsequently moved to Armenia on 29 October 2021.

Assassination 
Arıkan was gunned down in his car by two gunmen while waiting at a red light on the intersection of Wilshire Boulevard and Comstock Street in the Westwood area of Los Angeles. President Ronald Reagan condemned the murder as "an apparent act of terrorism".

The jury determined that Sassounian had shot Arıkan to death, on January 28, 1982, at 9:40 a.m. Sassounian was sentenced to life in prison. The jury determined that the killing targeted Arıkan based on his nationality, for that reason, Sassounian was given no chance of parole.

His judicial expenses were once paid by Armenian Revolutionary Federation (ARF) using funds raised for this purpose.

Parole 
In 2002, prosecutors agreed to drop the "national origin" special circumstance of the case, making Sassounian eligible for parole, in exchange for his admitting his guilt and formally apologizing. "I participated in the murder of Kemal Arıkan. I renounce the use of terrorist tactics to achieve political goals. I regret the suffering of the Arıkan family."

The California Prison Parole Board rejected Sassounian's demands of release in 2006, 2010 and 2013. The California Board of Parole granted parole to Sassounian on 14 December 2016. Turkey's Ministry of Foreign Affairs condemned the decision of his release and Turkish American groups urged the California Governor to deny parole. California Governor Jerry Brown denied the parole in May 2017, vetoing the board's decision. In a statement, Brown said he believes Sassounian would still pose "an unreasonable danger to society if released," adding that "[t]he killing was a deliberate, planned assassination of a diplomat, plotted at least two weeks in advance."

Similarly, on 27 December 2019, the California Board of Parole approved the release of Sassounian. Gavin Newsom rejected the decision, despite a collective plea of the Pan-Armenian Council of the Western United States asking Newsom for the release of Sassounian.

In 2020, a court in Los Angeles reversed Newsom's decision. Newsom said he would not appeal. In his 2020 executive report, he wrote that he had considered the circumstances that shaped Sassounian's life when determining whether he should be paroled. The governor pointed to "significant challenges in his family of origin, including the consequences of intergenerational trauma, poverty, and instability resulting from the Armenian genocide in which Mr. Sassounian’s family members were killed."

Secretary of State Antony Blinken expressed disappointment in the parole decision: "Attacking a diplomat is not only a grave crime against a particular individual, it is also an attack on diplomacy itself. To ensure the safety of the dedicated U.S. diplomats serving around the world, it has been the longstanding position of the United States to advocate that those who assassinate diplomats receive the maximum sentence possible, and that they serve those sentences without parole or early release."

On the October 29, 2021, the ARF Western Region informed the public that Sassounian has arrived in Armenia, implying that he is free.

Personal life 
Sassounian was born on January 1, 1963, in Beirut, Lebanon. He hails from a family of Lebanese Armenian émigrés.

See also 

 Gourgen Yanikian

Notes 

American assassins
American people of Armenian descent
American people of Lebanese descent
American people convicted of murder
People convicted of murder by California
American prisoners sentenced to life imprisonment
Prisoners sentenced to life imprisonment by California
Living people
Armenian assassins
People from Beirut
Lebanese people of Armenian descent
1963 births